Amplexus was an Italian record label that was founded by Stefano Gentile that specialized in limited-edition mini CDs by notable ambient artists such as Steve Roach, vidnaObmana, Robert Rich, and Michael Stearns. It went out of business in 2003 and was replaced by Silentes.

See also
 List of record labels

External links
Amplexus

Italian record labels
Ambient music record labels
Defunct record labels of Italy